Basit Ashfaq (born 13 January 1986 in Lahore) is a professional squash player who represented Pakistan. He reached a career-high world ranking of World No. 61 in April 2006.

Basit has played for Trinity Bantams and been part of one of the biggest successes in collegiate history across all sports. The Trinity Bantams squash team won 252 consecutive team encounters, going undefeated from 1998 to 2012.

References

External links 
 
 

Pakistani male squash players
Living people
1986 births
Trinity Bantams men's squash players